School for Coquettes (French: L'école des cocottes) is a 1935 French comedy film directed by Pierre Colombier and starring Raimu, André Lefaur and Renée Saint-Cyr. It is based on the 1918 play School for Coquettes by Marcel Gerbidon and Paul Armont. In Edwardian Paris, a young working-class girl attends an academy which teaches her the arts of a coquette to enable her to rise in society.

The film's sets were designed by the art director Jacques Colombier. Future star Ginette Leclerc had a small supporting role.

Cast
 Raimu as Labaume 
 André Lefaur as Stanislas de la Ferronnière 
 Renée Saint-Cyr as Ginette 
 Henry Roussel as Racinet 
 Jean Marconi as Robert 
 Pauline Carton as Mme Bernoux 
 Madeleine Suffel as Amélie
 Andrée Doria
 Ginette Leclerc
 Auguste Mouriès
 Georges Tréville

References

Bibliography
 Dayna Oscherwitz & MaryEllen Higgins. The A to Z of French Cinema. Scarecrow Press, 2009.

External links

1935 films
French historical comedy films
1930s French-language films
Films directed by Pierre Colombier
French films based on plays
Films set in Paris
Films set in the 1900s
1930s historical comedy films
Pathé films
French black-and-white films
1930s French films